Gabby Barrett Foehner (born March 5, 2000) is an American country music singer. She finished third on the 16th season of American Idol. Her debut single  "I Hope" was the first top 10 Hot Country Songs debut by an unaccompanied woman since October 2017. It became a top three hit on the Billboard Hot 100 and has been certified 7× Platinum by the RIAA. Her debut album Goldmine was released on June 19, 2020. Country Now called Barrett "country music's next female superstar". Awarded 1 iHeartRadio Music Awards along with the accomplishment of reaching 1 Billion Total Audience Spins for "I Hope" with Charlie Puth.

Early life
Barrett is one of eight children born to Blaise and Pam Barrett. She attended Serra Catholic High School in McKeesport, Pennsylvania, but transferred to Pennsylvania Cyber Charter School.

She started singing at nine and doing shows at eleven. In 2014, she won the Kean Quest Talent Search. At 14, her father encouraged her to sing in an all-black choir, which prompted her to join the Lamb of God Christian Ministries in Homestead, Pennsylvania.

Career

2017–2018: American Idol, post-Idol

Barrett auditioned for the 16th season of American Idol in Nashville, Tennessee. She progressed through to the Finale before being voted off.

After Barrett appeared on American Idol, she collaborated with songwriter and producer Allen Foster to write three songs on her extended play The Fireflies: "Fireflies", "Your Name On It", and "Missin' Love".

2019–present: "I Hope" and Goldmine

In 2019, Barrett independently released "I Hope", which was co-written by Jon Nite and Zachary Kale and co-produced by Zachary Kale and Ross Copperman. She performed the song in an appearance on the 17th season of American Idol in May 2019.  The song attracted the attention of music labels, and Barrett announced on stage after the performance she had signed with Warner Music Nashville. "I Hope" was then officially released as a single by the label on June 27, 2019. The single topped Billboards Country Streaming Songs chart as well as the Country Airplay chart in April 2020, followed by the Hot Country Songs chart.
On April 7, 2020, a version featuring Charlie Puth was released. In 2019, Barrett opened for Toby Keith in Ohio, as well as Keith Urban.

On November 21, 2020, the single hit number three on the Billboard Hot 100, making her the first female country artist to do so since Taylor Swift. Puth has also been credited for the song on the Hot 100, which makes it his fourth top-ten single. As of January 2021, the single has been number one for 25 weeks on the Hot Country Songs chart.

Her debut album Goldmine was released on June 19, 2020. The album earned 15.98 million on-demand streams in its opening week, breaking the record for the largest streaming week ever for a debut country album by a woman. In 2021, Barrett opened up for Thomas Rhett on his Center Point Road Tour, and for the Zac Brown Band at Summerfest as part of their The Comeback Tour.

Along with performing at a Pittsburgh Pirates' game, she sang the national anthem for the Pittsburgh Steelers and at the Daytona 500. The song on the show selected for her if she won was "Rivers Deep." Carrie Underwood was quoted as saying that Barrett is further along than she was at her age.

In September 2021, Barrett was nominated for four 55th Annual Country Music Association Awards: Female Vocalist of the Year, Single of the Year ("The Good Ones"), Song of the Year ("The Good Ones"), and New Artist of the Year.

On October 26, 2021, Barrett announced a deluxe edition of Goldmine was to be released on November 19, 2021.

Personal life
Barrett married fellow Idol contestant Cade Foehner on October 5, 2019. 

Barrett gave birth to their first child, a daughter, on January 18, 2021. Barrett gave birth to their second child, a son, on October 27, 2022.

Discography

Albums

Singles

Promotional singles

Music videos

Tours
Supporting
That's Country Bro! Tour (2019) with Toby Keith
Center Point Road Tour (2021) with Thomas Rhett
The Comeback Tour (2021) with Zac Brown Band (one show)
Rock N' Roll Cowboy Tour (2022) with Jason Aldean

Awards and nominations

Notes

References

External links
 
 
 

2000 births
21st-century American women singers
American country singer-songwriters
American Idol participants
American women country singers
Country musicians from Pennsylvania
Country pop musicians
Living people
People from Munhall, Pennsylvania
Singer-songwriters from Pennsylvania
Warner Music Group artists